Heniel Diphete D. Bopape (born 1957) is a South African novelist, playwright and journalist.

Biography
Bopape was born in Transvaal Province, in what today is Limpopo. He graduated with a B.A. in Psychology from Unisa in 1987. At the time he was lecturing full-time at Dr. C.N. Phatudi College. He is the owner and editor of Seipone, a vernacular newspaper in Limpopo.

 (1982) pioneered the detective novel genre in Sepedi.

Works

Plays
, Pretoria: Van Schaik, 1978 

Novels
  [A Golden Vulture], Pretoria: Van Schaik, 1982
  [Tears], Pretoria: Van Schaik, 1985
 , Pretoria: De Jager-HAUM, 1987

Short story collections
  [Porridge of Tswiitswii], Pretoria: De Jager-HAUM, 1985

References

1957 births
Living people
South African journalists
South African dramatists and playwrights
South African male novelists 
Male dramatists and playwrights

Also Goitsemodimo Bopape